Anabelle Langlois (born July 21, 1981) is a Canadian pair skater. She is the 2008 Canadian Figure Skating Championships with Cody Hay and the 2002 Four Continents Figure Skating Championships silver medallist with Patrice Archetto.

Career 
Langlois teamed up with Patrice Archetto in 1998. She fractured her skull as a result of a fall on a throw jump at the 1998 Canadian Championships. She wore a hockey helmet for six months afterward. Langlois/Archetto won the silver medal at the 2002 Four Continents Championships, five Grand Prix medals, and five Canadian national medals. Jan Ullmark coached the pair in Edmonton. Their partnership ended when Archetto retired from competition in 2005.

Langlois teamed up with Cody Hay in 2005. The pair finished 4th at the 2006 Skate America. They were forced to withdraw from their second event, 2006 Cup of Russia, because the airline lost Langlois' skates. Langlois/Hay took bronze at the 2007 Canadian Championships and were named to their first Worlds team. They placed 10th at the 2007 World Championships in Tokyo, Japan.

In the 2007–08 season, Langlois/Hay competed at Skate Canada and NHK Trophy, before winning their first national title at the 2008 Canadian Championships in Vancouver, British Columbia. They went on to compete at the 2008 World Championships in Sweden, where they placed 8th.

Langlois sustained a spiral fracture to her lower right fibula during practice on July 23, 2008 and underwent surgery a week later, after which she had five screws and a metal plate in her ankle. The pair, assigned to the 2008 Skate Canada International and 2008 NHK Trophy, withdrew from both Grand Prix events. Langlois returned to training in mid-September but had trouble walking during a January 6, 2009 practice session. It was determined that she had tissue damage and the pair withdrew from the 2009 Canadian Championships. Around February 2009, she had surgery to remove the screws and metal plate. The pair subsequently withdrew from the 2009 Four Continents Championships and 2009 World Championships.

Langlois/Hay's first international competition back from her injury was the 2009 Nebelhorn Trophy held in Oberstdorf, Germany. Later on in November 2009, they were back on the Grand Prix circuit where they placed 4th at Skate Canada in Kitchener, Ontario. At the 2010 Canadian Championships in London, Ontario, Langlois/Hay won the silver medal behind Jessica Dubé / Bryce Davison and were named to the Olympic team. They placed 9th in Vancouver, British Columbia.

On May 21, 2010, Langlois announced her retirement from competition. She participated in the fall 2010 and fall 2011 seasons of Battle of the Blades on CBC.

Personal life 
Langlois and Hay became engaged in 2010. They married on May 21, 2012. Their daughter, Mia Olivia Hay, was born on March 28, 2013. Their son, Zac, was born in 2016. Langlois and her family now live in Waterloo, Ontario, where she works as Technical Director of the Kitchener-Waterloo Skating Club.

Programs

With Hay

With Archetto

Competitive highlights 

GP: Grand Prix

With Hay

With Archetto

References

External links

 
 
 Skate Canada Profile
 

1981 births
Living people
French Quebecers
Canadian female pair skaters
Figure skaters at the 2002 Winter Olympics
Olympic figure skaters of Canada
Battle of the Blades participants
Figure skaters at the 2010 Winter Olympics
Four Continents Figure Skating Championships medalists
Sportspeople from Shawinigan